Pásztor is a surname of Hungarian origin. People with that name include:

Ákos Pásztor (born 1991), Hungarian handballer
Andy Pasztor (active from 1995), American journalist
Austin Pasztor (born 1990), American football offensive tackle
Béla Pásztor (born 1938), Hungarian politician
Bence Pásztor (born 1995), Hungarian hammer thrower
Bettina Pásztor (born 1992), Hungarian handball goalkeeper
Gábor Pásztor (born 1982), Hungarian sprinter
István Pásztor (disambiguation), multiple people
János Pásztor (1881-1945), Hungarian sculptor
János Pásztor (diplomat) (born 1955), Hungarian diplomat
Szabolcs Pásztor (born 1959), Hungarian fencer who competed at the 1988 Summer Olympics

See also
 Pásztori, a village in Győr-Moson-Sopron county, Hungary
 

Surnames of Hungarian origin
Occupational surnames